The Auto Shopper Magazine was established by Showcase Publications, Inc. of Toms River, New Jersey in 1978. In 1991, after expanding throughout the Northeast, the Auto Shopper established a second branch in Lakeland, Florida. The magazine is published weekly and is distributed free of charge.

References

External links
 

1978 establishments in New Jersey
Automobile magazines published in the United States
Consumer magazines
Free magazines
Magazines established in 1978
Magazines published in New Jersey
Weekly magazines published in the United States